Frank Rhodes may refer to:

 Frank Rhodes (British Army officer) (1851–1905)
 Frank H. T. Rhodes (1926–2020), president of Cornell University, 1977–1995